Petri Virtanen (born 18 September 1980 in Jyväskylä) is a Finnish former basketball player. He stands 1.83 m tall and is head coach in Joensuun Kataja. Virtanen was a member of the Finland national basketball team. In FIBA EuroCup of 2007-08, playing for Lappeenrannan NMKY, he was one of the best scorers of the tournament averaging 16.2 points per game.

References
 Koripalloliitto
 Koris.net
 FIBA Europe

1980 births
Living people
Sportspeople from Jyväskylä
Finnish men's basketball players
21st-century Finnish people